Mansura is a town in Avoyelles Parish, Louisiana, United States. The population was 1,419 at the 2010 census. Mansura is home to the Cochon de Lait Festival, and claims to be the Cochon de Lait capital of the world.

Louisiana 4-H Museum
The city of Mansura is the home of the Louisiana 4-H Museum and Hall of Fame. Opened in 2009, this museum has a complete history of 4-H in Louisiana from 1908 to present day. The museum boasts its Camp Grant Walker's Old Dance Pavilion look of its video screen and benches looking like the Greek Theatre seating. The museum also boasts its hall of fame with over 100 inductees and at least one from all of the 64 parishes of Louisiana.

Geography
Mansura is located at  (31.059242, -92.048660).

Demographics

2020 census

As of the 2020 United States census, there were 1,320 people, 623 households, and 288 families residing in the town.

2010 census
As of the census of 2010, there were 1,419 people, 591 households, and 343 families residing in the town. The racial makeup of the town was 37.6% White, 56.7% African American, 1.7% Native American, 0.1% Asian, 0.1% Native Hawaiian or Pacific Islander, 0.5% from other races, and 3.2% from two or more races. Hispanic or Latino of any race were 1.3% of the population.

There were 591 households, out of which 24.2% had children under the age of 18 living with them, 25.9% were married couples living together, 27.4% had a female householder with no husband present, and 42% were non-families. 39.4% of all households were made up of individuals, and 20.3% had someone living alone who was 65 years of age or older. The average household size was 2.28 and the average family size was 3.03.

In the town, the population was spread out, with 28.2% under the age of 18, 9.1% from 18 to 24, 25.2% from 25 to 44, 18.9% from 45 to 64, and 18.5% who were 65 years of age or older. The median age was 36 years. For every 100 females, there were 85.3 males. For every 100 females age 18 and over, there were 75.9 males.

The median income for a household in the town was $16,836, and the median income for a family was $19,612. Males had a median income of $26,250 versus $15,972 for females. The per capita income for the town was $11,473. About 34.4% of families and 40.4% of the population were below the poverty line, including 55.7% of those under age 18 and 27.6% of those age 65 or over.

Notable people
Felix Moncla, U.S. Air Force pilot who disappeared in 1953.
Johnathin E. Lewis IV, basketball player in the National Association of Intercollegiate Athletics (NAIA). Lewis played for Kansas Christian College in Overland Park, Kansas and Faith Baptist Bible School in Ankeny, Iowa. He was raised in Mansura. (May 2017}}
Vincent Simmons, born and raised in Mansura, is serving a 100-year sentence at Louisiana State Prison for attempted aggravated rape. Supporters are trying to have his case appealed because of problems of due process in the charges and his 1977 trial; exculpatory evidence was withheld by the prosecution. He was one of six men featured in the Academy Award-nominated film The Farm: Angola, USA (1997) and is the sole subject of its successor Shadows of Doubt: Vincent Simmons (2007).

Mayors of Mansura 

 Captain J.C. Joffrion, 1860
 Dr. Jules Charles Desfossé, 1861
 Nelson Durand, 1865
 David Siess, 1874
 Valery Coco, 1876
 F.J.C. Monnin, 1878
 Leandré François Roy, elected June 1878 (died November 1878)
 David Siess, 1879
 F.J.C. Monnin, 1880
 David Siess, 1881-82
 Pascalis D. Roy, 1884 (son of LF Roy)
 David Siess, June 1884
 Theo Forest, 1885
 David Siess, 1886-90

References

External links

Cochon de Lait Festival

Towns in Avoyelles Parish, Louisiana
Towns in Louisiana